Tarakeswar is a Kolkata Suburban Railway station on the Sheoraphuli–Tarakeswar branch line and is located in Hooghly district in the Indian state of West Bengal. It is a very important railway station of Hooghly district. It also one of the most busy railway station with high revenue of Eastern Railway. It serves Tarakeswar city and a large area of Hooghly district and also some parts of Howrah & Purba Barddhaman district. Due to very good bus connectivity from Tarakeswar to South Bengal; peoples of Bankura, East & West Midnapore also used this station.

History
The broad gauge Sheoraphuli–Tarakeswar branch line was opened by the Tarkessur Railway Company on 1 January 1885 and was worked by East Indian Railway Company.

Electrification
Howrah–Sheoraphuli–Tarakeswar line was electrified in 1957–58.

Amenities
Tarakeswar railway station has a six-bedded dormitory.

References

External links
 Trains at Tarakeswar

Railway stations in Hooghly district
Howrah railway division
Kolkata Suburban Railway stations